CKLB is a Canadian radio station, broadcasting at  101.9 FM in Yellowknife, Northwest Territories. Owned by the Native Communications Society of the Northwest Territories, the station was licensed in 1985  (originally as CKNM-FM) and broadcasts a community radio format for the territory's First Nations population.  The station serves the entire Northwest Territories through a network of rebroadcasters.

CKLB has a number of rebroadcasters operating on low-power FM transmitters throughout Northwest Territories:

References

External links
 cklbradio.com
 
 
 CKLB Radio – Live Stream

Klb
Klb